John Gapper (born 31 May 1959) is associate editor and chief business commentator of the Financial Times. He writes a weekly column, appearing on the comment page, about business trends and strategy. Gapper is also co-author with Nick Denton of All That Glitters: The Fall of Barings and author of two novels, A Fatal Debt and The Ghost Shift.

Education 
Gapper was educated at St Benedict's School, Ealing and at Exeter College, Oxford where he studied Philosophy, Politics and Economics. He later became a Harkness Fellow of the Commonwealth Fund of New York, studying US education and job training at the Wharton School of the University of Pennsylvania.

Career 
Gapper trained on the Mirror Group training scheme, working at the Tavistock Times. He then worked for the Daily Mirror, Daily Mail and Daily Telegraph before joining the Financial Times in 1987. He became in turn the Financial Times labour editor, banking editor and media editor and was then appointed assistant editor in charge of the comment page. Gapper  became a columnist in 2003 and was based in New York between 2005 and 2012.

Books 
 All That Glitters: The Fall of Barings
 How To Be A Rogue Trader
 A Fatal Debt
 The Ghost Shift

Awards 
 Business commentator, Editorial Intelligence Comment Awards 2011 and 2014.
 Gerald Loeb Award for commentary 2013.
 International commentary, Society of American Business Editors and Writers Awards 2014.

References

External links

John Gapper profile at Financial Times 
What Makes a Rogue Trader Tick? - Freakonomics blog

21st-century British novelists
Living people
British male novelists
British business and financial journalists
Financial Times people
British business writers
1959 births
People educated at St Benedict's School, Ealing
Gerald Loeb Award winners for Columns, Commentary, and Editorials
21st-century British male writers